I37 or I-37 may refer to:

 Astrodomi Observatory, Tigre, Buenos Aires Province, Argentina
 Interstate 37, a highway in Texas, United States